William Muir Gibson (21 July 1898 – 1992) was a Scottish professional footballer who played as a left half.

Career
Born in Larkhall, Gibson played for Ayr United, before moving to Newcastle United, where he made over 120 appearances in the English Football League.

Gibson was trainer of Queen's Park from 1946 until 1963.

Personal life
His father Neilly and brothers Neil and James were also footballers.

References

1898 births
1992 deaths
Scottish footballers
Sportspeople from Larkhall
Footballers from South Lanarkshire
Association football wing halves
Larkhall Thistle F.C. players
St Anthony's F.C. players
Ayr United F.C. players
Newcastle United F.C. players
Scottish Football League players
Scottish Junior Football Association players
English Football League players
Scottish football managers
Queen's Park F.C. managers
Scottish Football League managers
FA Cup Final players